Castle Lime Works Quarry is a 1.6 hectare (3.9 acre) geological Site of Special Scientific Interest near South Mimms in Hertfordshire. The site was notified in 1986 under the Wildlife and Countryside Act 1981. The site is a disused chalk quarry and according to Natural England:
This reveals extensive piping in the top of the chalk resulting from solution at the Chalk - Tertiary sediment interface. Believed to have formed during the Tertiary and Pleistocene, it is the finest exposure of clay-filled pipes in the Chalk Karst of England.

The site is on private land and there is no public access.

See also
List of Sites of Special Scientific Interest in Hertfordshire

References

Sites of Special Scientific Interest in Hertfordshire
Sites of Special Scientific Interest notified in 1986
Hertsmere
Geological Conservation Review sites
Quarries in Hertfordshire